Historical classification groups the various history topics into different categories according to subject matter as shown below.

Meta-history
Philosophy of history

By geographic region
World
Africa
Americas
Asia
Europe
Oceania
Antarctica

By geographic subregion
North America
South America
Latin America
Central America
Pre-Columbian
Mesoamerica
Caribbean
Eurasia
History of Europe
Prehistoric Europe
Classical antiquity
Late Antiquity
Middle Ages
Early modern period
Modern Europe
Central Asia
South Asia
East Asia
Southeast Asia
Middle East
Ancient Near East
Australasia (Australia, New Guinea, Micronesia, Melanesia, Polynesia)
Pacific Islands

By date
Centuries
Decades
Periodization
List of named time periods
List of timelines

By time period
Prehistory
Ancient history
Modern world

See also Periodization.

By religion
History of religion
History of Christianity
History of Islam
Jewish history
History of Buddhism
Hinduism History of Hinduism

By nation
History of extinct nations and states

By field
Cultural movements
Diaspora studies
Family history
Environmental history
Local history
Maritime history
Microhistory
Confederation
Social History
Urban History

Mathematics and the hard sciences
History of mathematics
History of science and technology
History of astronomy
History of physics
History of chemistry
History of geology
History of biology
History of medicine
History of mental illness

Social sciences
History of art
History of astrology
History of cinema
History of economic thought/Economic history
History of ideas
History of literature
History of music
History of philosophy
History of sexuality
History of theatre
Intellectual history
Legal history
Microhistory
Military history

By ideological classification (historiography)
Although there is arguably some intrinsic bias in history studies (with national bias perhaps being the most significant), history can also be studied from ideological perspectives, which practitioners feel are often ignored, such as:
Marxist historiography
Feminist history (also called herstory).

A form of historical speculation known commonly as counterfactual history has also been adopted by some historians as a means of assessing and exploring the possible outcomes if certain events had not occurred or had occurred in a different way. This is somewhat similar to the alternate history genre in fiction.

Lists of false or dubious historical resources and historical myths that were once popular and widespread, or have become so, have also been prepared.

classifications
Classifications
History